Ruler Foods, Inc. is a discount warehouse store grocery chain in the United States, currently owned by Kroger, and headquartered in Seymour, Indiana. It is a no-frills grocery store where 80% of the offerings are Kroger Brand, the customers bag their own groceries at the checkout, and rent shopping carts for 25 cents. Kroger operates Ruler Foods stores in Illinois, Indiana, Ohio, Kentucky, Missouri, and Tennessee.

It was part of JayC Food Stores, which was purchased by Kroger in 1999; however, as of 2018, JayC is now included in the Kroger Louisville division, with Ruler Foods now having its own division. Ruler Foods has its own corporate headquarters adjacent to Freeman Municipal Airport in Seymour, Indiana, which is 90 miles due west of its parent company's Cincinnati headquarters.

History
The concept was started by JayC Foods as a discount banner. By the end of 1998, the company operated three Ruler Foods store locations. After the purchase of JayC Foods by Kroger in 1999, the JayC division grew its Ruler Foods brand to 13 stores at the end of 2012, including the first store outside of Indiana. Some of the added Ruler Foods were conversions from JayC stores, which has 38 stores at the end of 2012. The company hasn’t been specific with the number of Ruler Foods locations it would like to open. The stores are about 20,000 square feet, about one-fifth the size of Kroger Marketplace stores. Ruler Foods locations are strictly grocery stores, with no pharmacy and no fuel center. Customers bag their own groceries and 'rent' shopping carts for 25 cents, which is then returned when the cart is replaced. This cuts down on the number of carts on the parking lot which lessens car damage and saves the customer money.

Locations

The majority of Ruler Foods locations are in Indiana, with some in Illinois, Ohio, Kentucky, and Missouri. Kroger opened its first Ruler Foods in Kentucky in Henderson. The first Ruler Foods in Ohio opened in Lima. A location in Brownsville, Tennessee opened in October 2015 and Milan, Tennessee in March 2016. Typically, Ruler Foods stores open in markets where Kroger does not have existing stores. New Ruler Foods stores have opened in Charleston, IL, St. Ann, MO, Cape Girardeau, MO, St. Louis, MO, Bellefontaine Neighbors, MO, St. Charles, MO, Belleville, IL, Fairview Heights, IL, Granite City, IL, Collinsville, IL, Highland, IL, Olney, IL, Robinson, IL, Springfield, IL, Godfrey, IL, Martin, TN, Milan, TN, Cynthiana, KY and Princeton, KY. Ruler's expansion to St. Louis is a return to the city for Kroger, who previously operated about 50 stores in the area before pulling out in the 1980s amidst intense competition between several local chains. The store has even advertised that it carries Kroger-brand goods, interviewing customers who remembered them or their families shopping at Kroger and remembering its quality.

As of April 2016, Ruler Foods operated 43 stores in six Midwest and Midsouth states — Indiana, Illinois, Kentucky, Missouri, Ohio, and Tennessee. As of July 2019, the number had increased to about 50 stores, but also over that time a new logo and branding were introduced and most stores were extensively remodeled.

See also
 Food 4 Less

References

External links
  (Kroger)

Kroger
Supermarkets of the United States
Companies based in Indiana
Jackson County, Indiana